Fear and Love is the debut LP by the San Diego rock band We Shot the Moon, made up of Jonathan Jones of Waking Ashland, and Dan Koch and Joe Greenetz both of Sherwood.  It was released to iTunes on April 1, 2008, and in stores on April 29, 2008. The band hinted at a few key shows (particularly in Rexburg, Idaho) in the mountain west that the album would "leak" to the internet on Friday, January 18, 2008.  The downloading service hit its limit of downloads that day, however the album is still available through various other websites and file sharing services.

The album cover was the result of a design contest held by the band, letting the fans decide what the cover would look like.

Track listing
Water's Edge (2:33)
Sway Your Head (3:16)
LTFP (4:08)
Faces (3:09)
Perfect Time (4:00)
Tunnel Vision (3:35)
Julie (3:12)
On Your Way (3:51)
Hope (4:13)
Upon Waking She Found Herself a Cougar (3:45)
In the Blue (4:02)
Please Shine (4:22)

References 

2008 albums
We Shot the Moon albums